Leflore County is a county located in the U.S. state of Mississippi. As of the 2020 census, the population was 28,339. The county seat is Greenwood. The county is named for Choctaw leader Greenwood LeFlore, who signed a treaty to cede his people's land to the United States in exchange for land in Indian Territory. LeFlore stayed in Mississippi, settling on land reserved for him in Tallahatchie County.

Leflore County is part of the Greenwood, MS Micropolitan Statistical Area. It is located in the Mississippi Delta region, with its southern border formed by the Yazoo River. Its riverfront lands were developed before the Civil War as cotton plantations. More inland areas were developed in the later 19th century.

Leflore County, which is still largely rural, is noted for having the highest level of child poverty of any county in the United States. Mechanization of agriculture reduced jobs available for many workers in the 20th century, and there are few opportunities. The population has declined dramatically since its peak in 1930 as people continue to leave for opportunities elsewhere.

History
Leflore County was formed in 1871 during the Reconstruction era from portions of Carroll, Sunflower and Tallahatchie counties.  It was named for Greenwood Leflore, a Choctaw chief. During the period of Indian Removal in the 1830s, he was one of the chiefs who signed the Treaty of Dancing Creek of 1830, by the terms of which the Choctaw sold to the US their remaining lands east of the Mississippi River. Most Choctaw migrated to the Indian Territory (now Oklahoma), but Leflore and some others remained in Mississippi. He became a state and US citizen, a planter who owned African-American slaves, and at times served as a politician.

Following the American Civil War, during Reconstruction the majority-black population of freedmen in the county gained emancipation and suffrage, participating for the first time in formal politics. They supported the Republican Party, as President Abraham Lincoln had gained their freedom. In the mid-1870s, the Red Shirts, a white paramilitary organization working on behalf of the Democratic Party, developed chapters in Mississippi. They worked to disrupt Republican meetings, suppress the black vote, and turn Republicans out of office so that white Democrats could regain control of the state legislature.

One particular act of mass violence stands out: In September 1889, organizing by the Colored Farmers' Alliance sparked false rumors of an impending Black "uprising." Mississippi Governor Robert Lowry ordered the state militia to Leflore County.  Militia troops killed an estimated 25 Black people.

In the period from 1877 to 1950, Leflore County had 48 documented lynchings of African Americans, by far the highest number in the state and third highest in the United States. Most occurred around the turn of the 20th century, as part of white imposition of Jim Crow conditions and suppression of black voting. Mississippi had more lynchings than any other state and used violence as a means to terrorize and retain control the African-American population. In 1890 the state legislature passed a new constitution that had a variety of devices to disenfranchise blacks; they developed ways around court cases that tried to dismantle these, and kept blacks excluded from the political system and racially segregated into the 1960s.

20th century to present

In the first half of the 20th century, many blacks left rural counties such as Leflore, in the Great Migration to northern and midwestern industrial cities to escape racial violence, and in search of jobs and education: many people went north by train to Chicago, taking their music with them and changing the big city forever. Many more people left Mississippi from 1940 to 1970, often migrating to the West Coast for defense industry jobs.

As with other parts of the majority-black Delta, Leflore County was a major site of activism and white violence during the Civil Rights Movement. In 1955, the events leading up to the lynching of 14-year-old Emmett Till unfolded in the unincorporated community of Money, Mississippi. Till, a teenage African-American, was visiting from Chicago and staying with relatives in Money, where Bryant's Grocery and Meat Market was located. Here Till encountered Carolyn Bryant, who later said that he had behaved flirtatiously toward her. Bryant's husband, Roy Bryant, and another white man, J.W. Milam, abducted Till later that evening. They beat and tortured him at several locations in Leflore and neighboring counties before shooting him and dumping his body in the river in Tallahatchie County, Mississippi. Bryant and Milam were acquitted by an all-white jury of Till's murder at the Tallahatchie County Courthouse, in Sumner, Mississippi.

During a 2007 interview, not made public until 2017, Carolyn Bryant had disclosed that she had fabricated her testimony about Till's actions.

In 1963, the county had more than 13,000 blacks of legal voting age, but fewer than 270 were registered because of discrimination and suppression by whites. Blacks had been essentially disfranchised since implementation of Mississippi's new constitution in 1890, establishing poll taxes, literacy tests and other voter registration barriers. Meanwhile, 95% of eligible white voters were registered.

The Student Nonviolent Coordinating Committee had moved its headquarters to Greenwood in early 1963, and by late March of that year, eight SNCC members were arrested while trying to register voters.  The United States Department of Justice Civil Rights Division filed suit against the city of Greenwood and Leflore County to obtain their release.  The petition was denied by a local court, but the city of Greenwood entered into a voluntary agreement to release the students.  In June 1963, 45 residents of Itta Bena were arrested in Leflore County while protesting an attack on churches where voter registration drives were being held.  The Civil Rights Division of DOJ filed suit against the county to obtain their release as well, but to no avail. Passage of national civil rights legislation by Congress in 1964 and 1965 began to change the ground rules, especially as it authorized federal oversight and enforcement in counties with a history of an under-representation of minority voters.

Organizers and marchers returned to the county in 1966 as part of the March Against Fear, initiated by James Meredith. He was shot and wounded by a white man two days into the march. Major civil rights leaders and marchers from a variety of organizations vowed to continue his march of more than 220 miles from Memphis, Tennessee to Jackson, Mississippi. By the time they reached Greenwood, several hundred persons were in the group. They worked to organize and register voters, as most blacks in the county still lived in fear and had not registered. After previous registration drives, the white county board had cut off federal commodity subsidies to the black community, threatening the survival of numerous poor families. SNCC helped organize a national gathering of food for county residents to overcome the boycott.

In 1966, Stokley Carmichael, a new leader of SNCC, spoke in Greenwood for "Black Power", saying that blacks had to build their own bases of political and economic power, as had communities of Irish, Italian and Jewish immigrants to the United States.

Blues musicians
L.C. Green was one of several notable blues guitarists who came from Leflore County, Mississippi. Other notable natives and one-time residents of the county were (in alphabetical order) David "Honeyboy" Edwards, Guitar Slim, Luther Johnson (Guitar Junior), Richard "Hacksaw" Harney, Robert Johnson, Rubin Lacey, Furry Lewis, Tommy McClennan, Dion Payton, Robert Petway, Brewer Phillips, Fenton Robinson, Hubert Sumlin, and Hound Dog Taylor.

Geography

Major highways
  U.S. Route 49E
  U.S. Route 82
  Mississippi Highway 7
  Mississippi Highway 8

Adjacent counties
 Tallahatchie County (north)
 Grenada County (northeast)
 Carroll County (east)
 Holmes County (southeast)
 Humphreys County (southwest)
 Sunflower County (west)

National protected area
 Mathews Brake National Wildlife Refuge
 Theodore Roosevelt National Wildlife Refuge (part)

Demographics

2020 census

As of the 2020 United States census, there were 28,339 people, 9,962 households, and 6,050 families residing in the county.

2010 census
As of the 2010 United States Census, there were 32,317 people living in the county. 72.2% were Black or African American, 24.9% White, 0.6% Asian, 0.2% Native American, 1.5% of some other race and 0.6% of two or more races. 2.3% were Hispanic or Latino (of any race).

2000 census
As of the census of 2000, there were 37,947 people, 12,956 households, and 8,887 families living in the county.  The population density was 64 people per square mile (25/km2).  There were 14,097 housing units at an average density of 24 per square mile (9/km2).  The racial makeup of the county was 67.73% Black or African American, 30.00% White, 0.11% Native American, 0.65% Asian, 0.04% Pacific Islander, 0.98% from other races, and 0.50% from two or more races.  1.90% of the population were Hispanic or Latino of any race.

According to the census of 2000, the largest ancestry groups in Leflore County were African 67.73%, English 19%, and Scots-Irish 9.4%

There were 12,956 households, out of which 35.40% had children under the age of 18 living with them, 36.00% were married couples living together, 27.60% had a female householder with no husband present, and 31.40% were non-families. 28.20% of all households were made up of individuals, and 11.60% had someone living alone who was 65 years of age or older.  The average household size was 2.70 and the average family size was 3.33.

In the county, the population was spread out, with 29.70% under the age of 18, 13.10% from 18 to 24, 27.00% from 25 to 44, 18.20% from 45 to 64, and 11.90% who were 65 years of age or older.  The median age was 30 years. For every 100 females, there were 92.50 males.  For every 100 females age 18 and over, there were 87.50 males.

The median income for a household in the county was $21,518, and the median income for a family was $26,059. Males had a median income of $25,959 versus $18,497 for females. The per capita income for the county was $12,553.  About 29.10% of families and 34.80% of the population were below the poverty line, including 48.00% of those under age 18 and 24.50% of those age 65 or over.

Government and infrastructure
The Delta Correctional Facility, operated by the Corrections Corporation of America on behalf of the Mississippi Department of Corrections, is located in Greenwood in Leflore County.

Education

Colleges and Universities

Additionally the county is in the district for Mississippi Delta Community College. The main campus is in Moorhead in Sunflower County.

Primary and secondary schools
 Public School District: Greenwood-Leflore Consolidated School District, formed on July 1, 2019, from the consolidation of the Greenwood Public School District and the Leflore County School District The district is the only school district in Leflore County.
 Greenwood High School (formerly of the Greenwood District)
 Amanda Elzy High School (formerly of the Leflore Co. District)
 Leflore County High School (formerly of the Leflore Co. District)
 Private Schools
 Delta Streets Academy
 Pillow Academy — formerly a segregation academy.

Communities

Cities
 Greenwood (county seat)
 Itta Bena

Towns
 Morgan City
 Schlater
 Sidon

Census-designated place
 Mississippi Valley State University CDP

Unincorporated communities

 Berclair
 Browning
 McNutt
 Minter City (partly in Tallahatchie County)
 Money
 Quito
 Rising Sun
 Ruby
 Shellmound
 Sunnyside
 Swiftown
 Wildwood

Ghost town
 Colony Town

See also

 National Register of Historic Places listings in Leflore County, Mississippi

References

External links
 Leflore County website

 
Mississippi counties
Greenwood, Mississippi micropolitan area
1871 establishments in Mississippi
Poverty in the United States
Populated places established in 1871
Black Belt (U.S. region)
Majority-minority counties in Mississippi